Otto Wilhelm Heinrich Wagener (29 April 1888 – 9 August 1971) was a German major general and, for a period, Adolf Hitler's economic advisor and confidant.

Life and career 

An industrialist's son, Wagener was born in Durlach, graduated from Gymnasium and then became an army officer. In 1916 during the First World War, Wagener was promoted to the General Staff.

After the war, Wagener was involved in the planning of an attack against the city of Posen (now Poznań, in Poland), but had to flee to the Baltic countries to avoid arrest. There he merged all Freikorps associations into the German Legion, and assumed leadership after its leader, Paul Siewert, was murdered. After returning to Germany, he was active in Freikorps operations in Upper Silesia, Saxony, and the Ruhr area.

In 1920 he studied economics and managed to broaden his knowledge by traveling abroad. In 1929 Wagener joined the Nazi Party (NSDAP) and the Sturmabteilung (SA), having been recruited by his old Freikorps comrade Franz Pfeffer von Salomon. Wagener was able to put his business acumen and contacts to good usage for the Nazi Party, in this case for the SA:

Wagener had used his business contacts to persuade a cigarette firm to produce "Sturm" cigarettes for SA men – a "sponsorship" deal benefiting both the firm and SA coffers. Stormtroopers were strongly encouraged to smoke only these cigarettes. A cut from the profit went to the SA ....

He functioned as SA Chief of Staff from October 1929 through December 1930, assuming effective command of the SA for a few months in the wake of the Stennes Revolt until the assumption of command by Ernst Röhm as the new Chief of Staff in early January 1931. In 1933 he became a member of the Reichstag for the NSDAP. In January 1931, Wagener led the Political-economic Department of the NSDAP, and in September 1932 he was appointed Hitler's personal economic advisor. Hitler appointed him Reichskommissar für die Wirtschaft from April to June 1933.

By late 1930 or early 1931 Wagener had made a mark on National Socialist economic policy. As Patch notes (p. 201-02):

Wagener formulated an original set of economic policies based on corporatist and leadership principles in confidential talks with Hitler and succeeded in recruiting many middle echelon industrial managers and owners of small factories for the NSDAP....[A confidential draft by Wagener] embraced the ideal of the corporatist "company union" (Werksgemeinschaft) and described the employer as the "Fuhrer" within his factory. All disputes over wages and working conditions would be settled within the "family" of the individual company in the National Socialist state of the future. Trade unions would be responsible merely for vocational training.

Wagener was replaced in his role as Commissioner for Economic Questions by Wilhelm Keppler, as Wagener had become embroiled in "coordination" disputes with leaders of industry after the National Socialist assumption of national power in January 1933, even forcibly occupying the industry-run trade association "Reich Association of German Industry" with the intention of shutting it down. Internal conflicts led to legal proceedings against Wagener in 1933 and 1934 in a case brought before the USCHLA (Party tribunal). After the Night of the Long Knives, Wagener was detained for a short time. Nevertheless, he was rehabilitated, and he resumed his career in the army.

In the Second World War, Wagener served at the front, rising to the rank of major general and becoming a division commander. Under his command of the island of Rhodes, a post he held from 20 July 1944, almost the complete Jewish population was murdered. After the war, Wagener was kept first in British and later, from 1947 to 1952, Italian prisoner of war camps.

In 1946, while being held by the British, Wagener wrote his memoirs about Hitler and the Nazi Party's early history, entitled Hitler aus nächster Nähe. Aufzeichnungen eines Vertrauten 1929−1932 (known in English as Hitler: Memoirs of a Confidant). His work was not published until seven years after his death, in 1978. His memoirs are used, to some degree, by historians of Nazi Germany.

Otto Wagener died in Chieming in 1971.

Decorations and awards
1914 Iron Cross 2nd Class
1914 Iron Cross 1st Class
Military Karl-Friedrich Merit Order
1929 Nuremberg Party Day Badge, c.1929
1939 Clasp to the Iron Cross 2nd Class
1939 Clasp to the Iron Cross 1st Class
The Honour Cross of the World War 1914/1918 with Swords, 
Honour Chevron of the Old Guard, 1934
Knight's Cross of the Iron Cross, 5 May 1945 as Generalmajor and commander of the Division Insel Rhodos

References
Informational notes

Citations

Bibliography

External links 

 Review of memoirs at The New York Times

1888 births
1971 deaths
20th-century Freikorps personnel
Holocaust perpetrators in Greece
Major generals of the German Army (Wehrmacht)
German Army personnel of World War I
Nazi Party officials
People from the Grand Duchy of Baden
Members of the Reichstag of Nazi Germany
Recipients of the Knight's Cross of the Iron Cross
Adolf Hitler
Kapp Putsch participants
German prisoners of war in World War II held by the United Kingdom
History of Rhodes
Military personnel from Karlsruhe